Piedrahita is a surname. Notable people with the surname include:

 Juan Piedrahita (born 1992), Colombian racing driver
 Luis Piedrahita (born 1977), Spanish comedian
 Marlon Piedrahita (born 1985), Colombian footballer
 Kevin Piedrahita (born 1991), American soccer player of Colombian descent